David Huntsinger is a pianist, composer, songwriter, and arranger who moved from his native California to Nashville, TN, in 1976 and played for the Rambos. He co-wrote the song, "Holy Spirit, Thou Art Welcome", with Dottie Rambo, as well as the children’s musical, Down By The Creek Bank. In 1979 he left the Rambos to pursue a career as a studio pianist. He wrote and arranged music for the 1989 Grammy-winning album A Child’s Gift of Lullabyes, and arranged for and co-produced Andy Griffith’s 1996 Grammy-winning album, I Love To Tell The Story: 25 Timeless Hymns. He has worked with many artists, such as Sandi Patti, Steve Green, Kathy Troccoli, Michael Crawford, Glen Campbell, Carman, Larnelle Harris, Johnny Cash and Dolly Parton. He toured with Vince Gill for a Christmas tour in 1999, and in 2001 for the Amy Grant/Vince Gill Christmas tour. He has also written a number of children’s musicals, as well as produced many albums of his own original works and arrangements. He played the piano for An Unfinished Life, and contributed to two songs heard in The Great Debaters. He arranged for and played piano in the 1997 Christmas album Piano Winterlude (Unison). He has done several projects for Discovery House Music. In 2010 he composed a number of pieces for a special 25th Anniversary concert for the international television network 3ABN called Pillars of Our Faith.

References

Living people
American male composers
20th-century American composers
Musicians from Nashville, Tennessee
20th-century American pianists
American male pianists
21st-century American pianists
20th-century American male musicians
21st-century American male musicians
Year of birth missing (living people)